was a district located in Kōchi Prefecture, Japan.

As of 2003, the district had an estimated population of 64,104 and a density of 96.44 persons per km2. The total area was 664.70 km2.

Towns and villages
Merged forming the city of Kami:
 Kahoku
 Monobe
 Tosayamada

Merged forming the city of Kōnan:
 Akaoka
 Kagami
 Noichi
 Yasu
 Yoshikawa

Mergers
 On March 1, 2006 - the towns of Akaoka, Kagami, Noichi and Yasu, and the village of Yoshikawa were merged to create the city of Kōnan.
 On March 1, 2006 - the towns of Kahoku and Tosayamada, and the village of Monobe were merged to create the city of Kami. Kami District was dissolved as a result of this merger.

Former districts of Kōchi Prefecture